The Choragic Monument of Nikias is a memorial building built in the Acropolis of Athens in 320–319 BCE to commemorate the choregos Nikias, son of Nikodemos. It was situated between the Theatre of Dionysos and the Stoa of Eumenes where its foundations remain along with some fragmentary elements of the structure.  It was built in the form of a substantial hexastyle Doric temple with a square cella and might have been surmounted with the prize tripod of the Dionysia.  The monument was dismantled at some point in late antiquity and the masonry reused in the Beulé Gate.

Most of the surviving architectural remains of the choragic monument are built into the central portion of the Beulé Gate, which was uncovered and identified by its inscription by Charles Ernest Beulé in 1852. 

The original site of the monument, however, was not excavated until 1885 by Wilhelm Dörpfeld, who four years later discovered the foundations of the building and some other fragmentary members. William Dinsmoor confirmed Dörpfeld's conclusions in a detailed analysis and associated the foundations with the epistyle preserved on the Beulé Gate. The exact date of the destruction of the monument is unknown, however, Dinsmoor argued that it might have been at the same time as the demolition of the Stoa of Eumenes either in the late Roman period or at the time of the reconstruction of the Theatre of Dionysos by Phaidros in the 3rd or 4th century CE.

Two of the major choragic monuments that have survived (Thrasyllos' and Nikias') belong to the period of oligarchic rule under the Macedonian regency, and it is perhaps significant that these are not on the Street of the Tripods, where most choragic prizes and monuments were placed. The conspicuous display of wealth and prestige they represent may have been an attempt to further the political careers of the choregoi and as such prompted the sumptuary law of Demetrios of Phaleron.

Notes

References

W. Dinsmoor, The Choragic Monument of Nicias, AJA 14, 1910, pp. 459–484
W. Dorpfeld, Das choragische Monument des Nikias., Ath. Mitt., X and XTV, 1885 and 1889
John Travlos, Pictorial dictionary of Ancient Athens, 1980
B. Perrin, The Choragic Monument of Nicias, American Journal of Archaeology, Vol. 15, No. 2 (Apr. - Jun., 1911), pp. 168-169
Peter Wilson, Athenian Institution of the Khoregia, 2001

Buildings and structures completed in the 4th century BC
Landmarks in Athens
Ancient Greek buildings and structures in Athens
Monuments and memorials in Greece
Late Classical Greece